Fully Loaded: God's Country is a 2019 compilation album by American country music singer Blake Shelton. It was released on December 13, 2019, via Warner Records Nashville. The album includes his most successful singles from the two previous albums, along with four new songs and a cover. Among the new songs are "God's Country" and the Trace Adkins duet "Hell Right", both released as singles. Fully Loaded: God's Country reached the number-one position on the Billboard Top Country Albums chart.

Content
Shelton announced the album in October 2019, by which point the blog The Boot had revealed the track listing. The album consists of the singles (except "Savior's Shadow") from Shelton's two previous albums, If I'm Honest and Texoma Shore, plus four new songs and a cover of Bobby Bare's "Tequila Sheila".

Critical reception
Rating it 3.5 out of 5 stars, Stephen Thomas Erlewine of AllMusic wrote that "the new cuts are strong enough, and when they're paired with the hits...it amounts to a pretty solid Blake Shelton album, albeit one that feels like the holding pattern it was intended to be."

Commercial performance
Fully Loaded debuted at No. 1 on Billboards Top Country Albums, which made this Shelton's seventh No. 1 on the chart. It also debuted at No. 2 on Billboard 200, having accrued 96,000 album-equivalent unit in the first week, 83,000 of which are in traditional album sales. It has sold 156,800 copies in the United States as of March 2020, and 1,106,000 units consumed.

Track listing

Personnel
Adapted from AllMusic

Blake Shelton - lead vocals
Trace Adkins - duet vocals on "Hell Right"
Gwen Stefani - duet vocals on "Nobody But You"
Jessi Alexander - background vocals
Bobby Bare - vocals on "Tequila Sheila"
Sam Bergeson - electric guitar, keyboards
Blake Bollinger - programming, synthesizer
Mike Brignardello - bass guitar
Kara Britz - background vocals
Tom Bukovac - electric guitar
Perry Coleman - background vocals
Devin Dawson - background vocals
Jeneé Fleenor - fiddle
Paul Franklin - pedal steel guitar
David Garcia - programming, background vocals
Kenny Greenberg - baritone guitar, electric guitar
Aubrey Haynie - fiddle, mandolin
Charlie Judge - synthesizer
Troy Lancaster - electric guitar
Brent Mason - electric guitar
Rob McNelley - electric guitar
Michael Hardy - acoustic guitar, background vocals
Gordon Mote - Hammond B-3 organ, piano, synthesizer, Wurlitzer
Justin Niebank - programming
Jimmy Olander - electric guitar on "I'll Name the Dogs"
Russ Pahl - pedal steel guitar
Jimmie Lee Sloas - bass guitar
Bryan Sutton - acoustic guitar, mandolin
Ilya Toshinsky - bouzouki, 12-string guitar, acoustic guitar, resonator guitar
Brett Tyler - background vocals
Derek Wells - electric guitar
Lonnie Wilson - drums
Brad Winters - background vocals
Nir Z. - drums, percussion, programming

Charts

Weekly charts

Year-end charts

Certifications

References

2019 compilation albums
Warner Records compilation albums
Blake Shelton albums
Albums produced by Scott Hendricks